is a Japanese actor and singer. He grew up in Hirakata, Osaka. His father is former actor Jo Azumi. His wife is Carolyn Kawasaki.

Filmography

TV series
NHK

Tokyo Broadcasting System

Fuji Television

TV Asahi

TV Tokyo

Films

References

External links
 

Japanese male film actors
Japanese male television actors
Japanese male child actors
1963 births
Living people
Male actors from Kyoto
Musicians from Kyoto